Thermococcus peptonophilus is a fast-growing hyperthermophilic archaeon. It is coccus-shaped, obligately anaerobic and about 0.7–2 μm in diameter. It is a strict anaerobe and grows exclusively on complex substrates, such as peptone, casein, tryptone, and yeast extract.  It cannot use carbon dioxide as a source of carbon.  Although it can grow somewhat in the absence of elemental sulfur, it prefers sulfur.

References

Further reading

Canganella, Francesco, et al. "Pressure and temperature effects on growth and viability of the hyperthermophilic archaeon Thermococcus peptonophilus."Archives of Microbiology 168.1 (1997): 1-7. 
Horikoshi, Koki. "Alkaliphiles: some applications of their products for biotechnology." Microbiology and Molecular Biology Reviews 63.4 (1999): 735–750.
Dworkin, Martin, and Stanley Falkow, eds. The Prokaryotes: Vol. 3: Archaea. Bacteria: Firmicutes, Actinomycetes. Vol. 3. Springer, 2006. *Martí, Joan, and Gerald Ernst, eds. Volcanoes and the Environment. Cambridge University Press, 2005.
Horikoshi, Koki, and Kaoru Tsujii, eds. Extremophiles in deep-sea environments. Springer, 1999.

External links

LPSN
WORMS
Type strain of Thermococcus peptonophilus at BacDive -  the Bacterial Diversity Metadatabase

Thermophiles
Euryarchaeota